Lace & Steel is a role-playing game published by TAGG (The Australian Games Group) in 1989.

Description
Lace & Steel is a fantasy swashbuckler role-playing system with rules for both swordplay and romance, set in a fantasy world that resembles 17th-century Europe, except that civilized centaurs ("half-horses") live side-by-side with humans. A card-based system quickly determines the results of all conflicts, fencing and sorcerous. Characters are generated using a tarot deck. Courtly skills are given equal weight with combat abilities. The game includes rules for sorcery, character honor, and mass and hand-to-hand combat, plus a scenario.

Publication history
Lace & Steel was designed by Paul Kidd, with art by Donna Barr, and published by TAGG (The Australian Games Group) in 1989 as a boxed set containing a 56-page book, two 48-page books, and a 24-page book, two card decks, and an outer box sleeve.

Reception
Lawrence Schick comments: "The rules take a highly original approach that will not be to all tastes [...] Definitely a system for players who are more interested in character interaction than in forming a group to go bash monsters."

Tie-Ins
The novel, Mus of Kerbridge authored by Paul Kidd, is set in the same world as the RPG.

Reviews
GamesMaster International Issue 1 - Aug 1990
Far & Away (Issue 1 - Apr 1990)

References

Australian role-playing games
Fantasy role-playing games
Multigenre Swashbuckler role-playing games
Role-playing games introduced in 1989